Vincent D'Autorio (October 1, 1915 – September 10, 2008) was an American gymnast. He competed at the 1948 Summer Olympics and the 1952 Summer Olympics.

References

1915 births
2008 deaths
American male artistic gymnasts
Olympic gymnasts of the United States
Gymnasts at the 1948 Summer Olympics
Gymnasts at the 1952 Summer Olympics
Sportspeople from Newark, New Jersey
20th-century American people